Leon Nowakowski, nom de guerre "Lig", (born 1908 near Odessa, died 1944 in Warsaw) was a Polish soldier, a member of the Home Army and the moderate faction of the National Armed Forces which merged with it, with a rank of major, creator and later the commander of the Chrobry II Battalion, participant in the Warsaw Uprising.

References

 Record from Muzeum Powstania Warszawskiego

1908 births
1944 deaths
Home Army members
Warsaw Uprising insurgents
Resistance members killed by Nazi Germany